{{speciesbox
| image = Ellioti.jpg
| status = LC
| status_system = IUCN3.1
| status_ref =  
| genus = Trioceros
| species = ellioti
| authority = (Günther, 1895)
| synonyms = *Chamaeleon ellioti 
Chamaeleon bequaerti 
Chamaeleon bitaeniatus ellioti 
Chamaeleo ellioti Chamaeleo (Trioceros) ellioti Trioceros ellioti 
| synonyms_ref = 
}}Trioceros ellioti, also known commonly as Elliot's chameleon, Elliot's groove-throated chameleon, and the montane side-striped chameleon, is a species of lizard in the family Chamaeleonidae. The species is indigenous to Africa.

Etymology
The specific name, ellioti, is in honor of British botanist George Francis Scott Elliot. 

Geographic rangeT. ellioti is found in Burundi, Democratic Republic of the Congo, Kenya, Rwanda, South Sudan, Tanzania, and Uganda.

Habitat
It has also been found in disturbed areas such as plantations, gardens, and open fields.

Reproduction
The mode of reproduction of T. ellioti has been described as viviparous and as ovoviviparous.

References

Further reading
de Witte G-F (1922). "Description de reptiles nouveaux du Congo Belge". Revue de Zoologie Africaine 10 (2): 66–71 + Plates I–II. ("Chamaeleon Bequaerti ", new species, pp. 69–70 + Plate II, figure 1). (in French).
Günther A (1895). "Notice of Reptiles and Batrachians collected in the Eastern Half of Tropical Africa". Annals and Magazine of Natural History, Sixth Series 15: 523–529 + Plate XXI. ("Chamæleon Ellioti ", new species, pp. 524–525 + Plate XXI, figure A).
Spawls S, Howell K, Hinkel H, Menegon (2018). Field Guide to East African Reptiles, Second Edition. London: Bloomsbury Natural History. 624 pp. . (Trioceros ellioti, p. 286).
Tilbury CR, Tolley KA (2009). "A re-appraisal of the systematics of the African genus Chamaeleo (Reptilia: Chamaeleonidae)". Zootaxa 2079: 57–68. (Trioceros ellioti'', new combination, p. 60).

Trioceros
Reptiles described in 1895
Taxa named by Albert Günther